The 1886–87 Scottish Cup was the 14th season of Scotland's most prestigious football knockout competition. Hibernian won the competition for the first time after they beat Dumbarton 2–1 in the final.

Calendar

Two teams qualified for the third round after drawing their second round replay.

Teams
All 139 teams entered the competition in the first round.

First round
Caledonian Rangers, Cambuslang Hibernian, Cowdenbeath, Dykehead and Moffat received a bye to the second round.

Matches

Replays

Notes

Sources:

Second round
Alloa Athletic, Coupar Angus, St Bernard's and Tollcross received a bye to the third round.

Matches

Replays

Notes

Sources:

Third round
Arbroath, Carfin Shamrock and Morton received a bye to the fourth round.

Matches

Replay

Sources:

Fourth round
The Scottish FA decided, on the motion of Mr M'Culloch of Dundee Harp, to ensure that the fourth round would be the last round requiring byes, and that there would be only five ties, all involving one of the five clubs that had received byes thus far.

Consequently, Clyde, Dumbarton, Dunblane, Dundee Harp, Hibernian, Hurlford, Kilmarnock, Port Glasgow Athletic, Queen's Park, Vale of Leven and 3rd Lanark RV all received a bye to the fifth round.

Matches

Sources:

Fifth round

As Dundee Harp could not afford to make the trip to Dumbarton, the club scratched from the competition, and invited Dumbarton to East End Park to play a friendly instead, which ended 2–2.  However Harp advertised the match as a Cup tie and many media outlets reported it as such.

Matches

Replays

Sources:

Quarter-finals

Matches

Replay

Second replay

Sources:

Semi-finals

Matches

Sources:

Final

References

Cup
Scottish Cup seasons
Scot